The 120th Pennsylvania House of Representatives District is located in Luzerne County and has been represented by Aaron Kaufer since 2015. The district includes the following areas:

 Courtdale
 Dallas Township
 Exeter
 Exeter Township
 Forty Fort
 Franklin Township
 Jackson Township
 Kingston
 Kingston Township
 Luzerne
 Pringle
 Swoyersville
 West Wyoming
 Wyoming

Representatives

During the 1990s, the district was predominantly Republican, especially in the towns of Kingston, West Pittston, and Shavertown. In recent years, the district has become increasingly Democratic. 57 percent of voters in the district are registered Democrats. It is a district that was carried by Al Gore in 2000, John Kerry in 2004, and Barack Obama in 2008. However, Republican Tom Corbett won the district in his race for governor in 2010. In 2012, incumbent President Obama won 55 percent of the district electorate. In 2016, businessman Donald Trump won the district. Kingston has been mostly Democratic since the late 2000s, West Pittston is now evenly split between the two parties, and Shavertown is only narrowly Republican now. 

The current state representative for the district, lifelong Kingston resident Aaron Kaufer, is a Republican. He easily won his first election in November 2014 by a 56% to 44% margin over Democrat Eileen Cipriani of West Wyoming. Kaufer succeeded longtime Democratic representative Phyllis Mundy, who represented the district for 24 years before retiring in 2014. 

The home seat of the district is Kaufer's hometown of Kingston, by far the largest municipality in the district.

Every representative that has served the 120th district has been a resident of Kingston.

Recent election results

References

External links
District Map from the United States Census Bureau
Pennsylvania House Legislative District Maps from the Pennsylvania Redistricting Commission.  
Population Date for District 45 from the Pennsylvania Redistricting Commission.

Government of Luzerne County, Pennsylvania
120